Dan LaCosta (born March 28, 1986) is a Canadian former professional ice hockey goaltender. He played 4 games in the National Hockey League with the Columbus Blue Jackets between 2008 and 2009. He was drafted in the third round, 94th overall, by the Blue Jackets in the 2004 NHL Entry Draft. Prior to becoming professional, LaCosta played junior ice hockey with the Wellington Dukes, Owen Sound Attack, and the Barrie Colts.

Playing career
LaCosta received many call-ups from the Columbus Blue Jackets American Hockey League farm team, the  Syracuse Crunch. In American Hockey League Syracuse he posted a record in his career overall a total of 40 wins, 42 losses and 7 ties. On February 10, 2009 against the Colorado Avalanche, LaCosta received his first NHL shutout in his second NHL career start for the Columbus Blue Jackets. He was only the 2nd goaltender in Newfoundland And Labrador history to play in the National Hockey League. LaCosta was one of only four players to play in the National Hockey League from the Labrador sector of Newfoundland and Labrador, the others being Darryl Williams (Los Angeles Kings), Pascal Pelletier (Boston Bruins and Chicago Blackhawks), and Chad Penney (Ottawa Senators).

After taking multiple blows to the head in the EIHL with the Cardiff Devils, he was advised by doctors to stop playing hockey due to recurring concussion symptoms, and retired on December 17, 2013.

Career statistics

Regular season and playoffs

External links
 

1986 births
Living people
Barrie Colts players
Canadian expatriate ice hockey players in the United States
Canadian ice hockey goaltenders
Cardiff Devils players
Columbus Blue Jackets draft picks
Columbus Blue Jackets players
Dayton Bombers players
Elmira Jackals (ECHL) players
Ice hockey people from Newfoundland and Labrador
New Brunswick Varsity Reds ice hockey players
Owen Sound Attack players
People from Labrador City
Syracuse Crunch players
Canadian expatriate ice hockey players in Wales